Moves is the second album by Singing Adams and is released by London indie label Records Records Records in December 2012.

The album was recorded and released by London, UK native Steven Adams, formerly of The Broken Family Band.

Recorded following an autumn tour of the United Kingdom, the album follows Adams' debut Everybody Friends Now. The album has also been reviewed by The Line of Best Fit, Bowlegs Music, Time Out Music, IoS, ArtRocker, Q and Uncut.

Track listing

References

External links
"Moves" Singing Adams web site

2012 albums